Zainab Chottani is a Pakistan based fashion designer who started as a bridal wear designer but has since then included prêt and haute couture in her forte.  She is one of the well known designers in  Pakistan for bridal wear and has displayed her creations in Pakistan as well as in Dubai, USA  and London.

Career
Chottani started in bridal fashion under the name of Zainab Sajid in 1999. She works with traditional colors and uses embroidery along with different cuts to form new designs. The designs contain influences from the Mughal Era where Royal women adorned heavily decorated dresses to look more attractive. Her bridal dresses are specifically made to order as to cater to the different requirements of each bride. She has displayed her bridal collection in various exhibitions including the Pantene Bridal Couture week  and Pakistan Fashion Week by Riwayat in the UK.

Aqua and Mera Pakistan

Zainab Chottani has added to her portfolio by introducing the brands Aqua and Mera Pakistan. Aqua is a fashion label which features ready to wear clothes for women. Launched in 2012, the brand makes clothes to be worn in the summer season by featuring bright colors and baggy shirts. Later it launched the Mera Pakistan collection in March 2012 which aimed to convert Pakistan’s cultural symbols into fashion. It did this by featuring rickshaws, traditional drums, the Minar-e-Pakistan on its kurta’s, a long shirt worn by women in Pakistan.

Exhibitions and fashion shows
Chottani did her first show in 2010 with Frieha Altaf, and has  showcased her work during the Pakistan Fashion Week and Bridal Couture Week. Creations from the house of Zainab Chottani have been displayed in various fashion shows. Models adorned her work in the Pakistan Fashion week in London alongside notable designers such as Sonya Battla, Sophia Mehta and Rizwan Ahmad. Her work was also displayed at the Pantene Bridal Couture Week where her notable personalities such as TV hosts Shaista Wahidi, Nida Yasir, Fahad Mustafa walked the ramp wearing her works with super model Nadia Hussain to follow. Apart from these shows, Chottani’s work has been showcased in Dubai and at her studio in which she introduces new lines of work.

References

External links

 

1982 births
Living people
Pakistani fashion designers
Pakistani women fashion designers
People from Karachi